Midwest Football League may refer to:
 Mid West Football League, an Australian rules football competition based in the Eyre Peninsula region of South Australia
 Midwest Football League (1921–1932), a minor professional American football league that was known as the Chicago Football League, in which the Chicago Cardinals played, from 1904 to 1920
 Midwest Football League (1935–1940), a minor professional American football league
 Midwest Football League (1962–1978), a minor professional American football league
 Midwest Professional Football League (1970–1972), a minor professional American football league in which the Omaha Mustangs played
 Midwest Football League (2002–), a semi-professional American football league whose Ohio River Bearcats team played at the Goebel Soccer Complex

See also
 Midwest Football Conference (NJCAA), a conference in the National Junior College Athletic Association